Hamdamsaltaneh Pahlavi (22 February 1903 – 1 January 1992) was the first child and daughter of Reza Shah of Iran and Maryam Savadkoohi.

Biography 
She was born on 22 February 1903 in Tehran and died in 1992. Her mother, Maryam Savadkoohi (also known as Tajmah), died when she was only one year old. Other sources mention Safiye Hamadani as her mother, a woman to whom Reza Khan was married briefly while serving in Hamadan. Hamdamsaltaneh was married to Hadi Atabay, and in 1925 bore her first child, a son, Amir Reza Atabay. Later, she gave birth to two more children, a son, Cyrus and a daughter, Simin (or Simine).

Amir Reza in turn later married Mahine Amir Mokri, and the couple had one son, Reza Atabay.

Honours 
Order of the Pleiades (Neshaan-e haft peikar), 2nd Class, (1957, Iran)
Order of Aryamehr (Neshān-e Āryāmehr), 2nd Class, (26 September 1967, Iran)

References

Hamdamsaltaneh
Mazandarani people
1903 births
1992 deaths